Dampierre-en-Yvelines is a commune in the Yvelines department in the Île-de-France region in north-central France.

The Castle of Dampierre-en-Yvelines 
One of the main features of the commune is the prominently featured castle, or Chateau, of Dampierre-en-Yvelines.  Hired by the Luynes family, the architect Jules Hardouin Mansart built Dampierre at the same time as he was working on the Palace of Versailles for the King Louis XIV.

15th and 16th Century 
Residence of the cardinal Charles de Lorraine, archbishop of Reims, and Duke of Chevreuse, the 15th century castle was considered by its owner as too austere. It was decided to completely rebuild the castle, making it bigger and embellishing it in the taste of the 16th century.

In his book  ‘The Most Excellent Buildings of France‘, Jacques I Androuet du Cerceau illustrates and documents this building.

18th Century 
During the 18th century, the outside appearance of the castle did not change much. However, many ameliorations were made in the different rooms, where intricate woodwork replaced the worn out ornaments of the 17 th century.

In 1758, an imposing entrance gate was installed in front of the castle.

19th Century 
Honoré Théodoric d'Albert de Luynes, the eighth Duke of Luynes, undertook deep restorations in order to showcase his scientific collection.

He hired Felix Duban to remodel the castle in the taste of the day while still maintaining the century long history of the building.

This created a mix of different styles brought by all the greatest artists of the time.

People
 Honoré d'Albert, Dukes of Luynes (1868–1924)
 Éric Judor, humorist
 Ian Delépine, humorist
 Joseph Marie (1821–1884), landscape gardener, born in Maincourt, drew the Parks d'Allier à Vichy. The Treyve are descended from him.

See also
Communes of the Yvelines department
 Château de Dampierre

References

Communes of Yvelines